Roger I. Glass is an American physician-scientist who serves as the Director of the John E. Fogarty International Center.

Education and early career 
Glass graduated from Harvard College in 1967, received a Fulbright Fellowship to study at the University of Buenos Aires in 1967, and received his M.D. from Harvard Medical School and his M.P.H. from the Harvard School of Public Health in 1972. He interned from 1972 to 1973 at Cambridge Hospital. He completed a residency in internal medicine at Mount Sinai Hospital from 1974 to 1976. At Sinai, Glass was also an instructor in the department of medicine and an epidemiology fellow with Thomas C. Chalmers. Glass joined the Centers for Disease Control and Prevention in 1977 as a medical officer with Philip J. Landrigan assigned to the Environmental Hazards Branch. He was a Scientist at the International Centre for Diarrhoeal Disease Research, Bangladesh (icddr,b) from 1979-1983 and returned to Sweden where he received his doctorate from the University of Gothenburg. His doctoral advisor was Jan Holmgren. His dissertation was titled Epidemiologic studies of cholera in rural Bangladesh.

Career 
From 1977 to 2006, Glass served as a medical director in the United States Public Health Service Commissioned Corps. In 1984, he joined the National Institutes of Health Laboratory of Infectious Diseases as a medical officer with Albert Kapikian on the molecular biology of rotavirus. In 1986, Glass returned to the CDC to become Chief of the Viral Gastroenteritis Unit at the National Center for Infectious Diseases. Glass was named Director of the Fogarty International Center and Associate Director for International Research by NIH Director Elias A. Zerhouni on March 31, 2006.

Research 
Glass's research interests are in the prevention of gastroenteritis from rotaviruses and noroviruses through the application of novel scientific research. He has maintained field studies in India, Bangladesh, Brazil, Mexico, Israel, Russia, Vietnam, China and elsewhere. His research has been targeted toward epidemiologic studies to anticipate the introduction of rotavirus vaccines. He is fluent and often lectures in five languages. Glass has co-authored more than 600 research papers and chapters.

Personal life 
Glass is married to Barbara J. Stoll and the father of three children Nina, Michael and Andy Glass. He speaks French, Spanish, Russian, Portuguese, Bengali, and English.

Awards and honors 
Glass has received numerous awards including the Charles C. Shepard Lifetime Scientific Achievement Award presented by the CDC in recognition of his 30-year career of scientific research application and leadership, the Dr. Charles Merieux Award from the National Foundation for Infectious Diseases for his work on rotavirus vaccines in the developing world. In 1994, he received the Public Health Service Outstanding Service Medal. Glass is also the recipient of the Albert B. Sabin Gold Medal, Georgetown University’s Cura Personalis Award, Research!America’s Geoffrey Beene Builders of Science Award, Rice University’s Rice 360˚ Institute for Global Health Award, and the Jimmy and Rosalynn Carter Humanitarian Award from the National Foundation for Infectious Diseases. He is a member of the Institute of Medicine. Glass is a fellow of the American College of Epidemiology and the Infectious Diseases Society of America.

References 

Living people
Year of birth missing (living people)
Harvard College alumni
Harvard Medical School alumni
Harvard School of Public Health alumni
University of Gothenburg alumni
United States Public Health Service Commissioned Corps officers
National Institutes of Health people
Centers for Disease Control and Prevention people
Emory University School of Medicine faculty
20th-century American physicians
20th-century American scientists
21st-century American physicians
21st-century American scientists
Members of the National Academy of Medicine